Kalayna Price is an American author best known for her Alex Craft novels, an urban fantasy series about a witch who solves crimes by speaking to the dead. She is represented by Lucienne Diver of the Knight Agency.

Biography
Price has a BFA in Studio art from the University of South Carolina. She is a member of Science Fiction Writers of America and is a regular contributor to Magical Words, an educational blog for writers written by writers, agents, and editors.

In the US, Price is published by Roc (Penguin USA) and Bell Bridge Books. Her Alex Craft novels are also available through Penguin in the UK, Australia, and New Zealand. German rights language for both series are held by Blanvalet, and it has been announced that French, Romanian, and Polish language rights have been sold.

Bibliography

Alex Craft Novels
Grave Witch (October 2010  )
Grave Dance (July 2011  )
Grave Memory (July 2012  )
Grave Visions(February 2016  )
Grave Ransom (July 2017  )
Grave Destiny (April 2019  )
Grave War (November 2020  )

Novels of Haven
Once Bitten (January 2009  )
Twice Dead (February 2010  )
Third Blood (Release date Unknown. Previous release dates (August 2012 and November 2012) were not met)

Anthologies 

 Ruby Red in Kicking It (2013 )

Audio Editions
Grave Witch (April 2011  ) -Tantor Media, read by Emily Durante
Grave Dance (July 2011  ) -Tantor Media, read by Emily Durante
Once Bitten (August 2011 ASIN B005G0UZN6 ) – Audible Frontiers, read by Piper Goodeve
Twice Dead (September 2011 ASIN B005G0V60W ) – Audible Frontiers, read by Piper Goodeve

Foreign Editions
Der Kuss der Ewigkeit -German edition of Once Bitten (December 2011  )-Blanvalet, Translated by Anita Nirschl
Vom Tod verführt – German edition of Grave Witch (July 2012 ) -Blanvalet, Translated by Lothar Woicke

External links

goodreads

References

Living people
21st-century American novelists
American fantasy writers
American horror writers
American women novelists
Urban fantasy writers
Women science fiction and fantasy writers
Women horror writers
21st-century American women writers
Year of birth missing (living people)